31 (thirty-one) is the natural number following 30 and preceding 32. It is a prime number.

In mathematics 

31 is the 11th prime number. It is a superprime and a self prime (after 3, 5, and 7), as no integer added up to its base 10 digits results in 31. It is a lucky prime and a happy number; two properties it shares with 13, which is its dual emirp and permutable prime. 31 is also a primorial prime, like its twin prime, 29.

31 is the number of regular polygons with an odd number of sides that are known to be constructible with compass and straightedge, from combinations of known Fermat primes of the form 22n + 1.

31 is the third Mersenne prime of the form 2n − 1. It is also the eighth Mersenne prime exponent, specifically for the number 2,147,483,647, which is the maximum positive value for a 32-bit signed binary integer in computing. After 3, it is the second Mersenne prime not to be a double Mersenne prime. 127, which is the 31st prime number, is a double Mersenne prime. The 31st triangular number is the perfect number 496, of the form 2(5 − 1)(25 − 1).

31 is a centered triangular number, the first prime centered pentagonal number and a centered decagonal number.

For the Steiner tree problem, 31 is the number of possible Steiner topologies for Steiner trees with 4 terminals.

At 31, the Mertens function sets a new low of −4, a value which is not subceded until 110.

31 is a repdigit in base 5 (111), and base 2 (11111).

The cube root of 31 is the value of pi correct to four significant figures.

For a time it was thought that every number of the form 3w1 would be prime. However, the next nine numbers of the sequence are composite; their factorisations are:

  = 17 × 
  = 673 × 
  = 307 × 
  = 19 × 83 × 
  = 523 × 3049 × 
  = 607 × 1511 × 1997 × 
  = 181 × 
  = 199 ×  and
  = 31 × 1499 × .

The recurrence of the factor 31 in the last number above can be used to prove that no sequence of the type RwE or ERw can consist only of primes because every prime in the sequence will periodically divide further numbers. Here, 31 divides every fifteenth number in 3w1 (and 331 every 110th).

31 is the 11th and final consecutive supersingular prime. After 31, the only supersingular primes are 41, 47, 59, and 71.

31 is the maximum number of areas inside a circle created from the edges and diagonals of an inscribed six-sided polygon, per Moser's circle problem. It is also equal to the sum of the maximum number of areas generated by the first five n-sided polygons: 1, 2, 4, 8, 16, and as such, 31 is the first member that diverges from twice the value of its previous member in the sequence, by 1.

In science 
 The atomic number of gallium

Astronomy 
 Messier object M31, a magnitude 4.5 galaxy in the constellation Andromeda. It is also known as the Andromeda Galaxy, and is readily visible to the naked eye in a modestly dark sky.
 The New General Catalogue object NGC 31, a spiral galaxy in the constellation Phoenix

In sports 
Ice hockey goaltenders often wear the number 31.

In other fields 
Thirty-one is also:
 The number of days in each of the months January, March, May, July, August, October and December
 The number of the date that Halloween and New Year's Eve are celebrated
 The code for international direct-dial phone calls to the Netherlands
 Thirty-one, a card game
The number of kings defeated by the incoming Israelite settlers in Canaan according to : "all the kings, one and thirty" (Wycliffe Bible translation)
A type of game played on a backgammon board
 The number of flavors of Baskin-Robbins ice cream; the shops are called 31 Ice Cream in Japan
 ISO 31 is the ISO's standard for quantities and units
 In the title of the anime Ulysses 31
 In the title of Nick Hornby's book 31 Songs
 A women's honorary at The University of Alabama (XXXI)
 The number of the French department Haute-Garonne
 In music, 31-tone equal temperament is a historically significant tuning system (31 equal temperament), first theorized by Christiaan Huygens and promulgated in the 20th century by Adriaan Fokker
 Number of letters in Macedonian alphabet
Number of letters in Ottoman alphabet
 The number of years approximately equal to 1 billion seconds
 It is using in Turkish slang language, it refers to masturbation.

References

External links 

 Prime Curios! 31 from the Prime Pages

Integers